Murder by Contract is a 1958 American film noir crime film directed by Irving Lerner. Academy Award-nominated screenwriter Ben Maddow did uncredited work on the film. Centering on an existentialist hit man assigned to kill a woman, the film is often praised for its spare style and peculiar sense of cool.

Though not widely seen at the time of its release, it finally appeared on DVD, included in the boxed set "Columbia Pictures Film Noir Classics, Vol. 1 (The Big Heat / 5 Against the House / The Lineup / Murder by Contract / The Sniper)," released November 3, 2009. The film has exerted an influence on American cinema, most notably on director Martin Scorsese, who famously cited Murder by Contract as "the film that has influenced [him] most."

Plot and main character

Plot synopsis
Claude (Vince Edwards) is a disaffected man who, in search of fast money to purchase a $28,000 house, decides to become a contract killer for a Mr. Brink. After proving his worth by killing targets in a barber shop and a hospital for a Mr. Moon (Michael Granger), whom he then kills at Brink's behest, Claude is given a contract to kill a witness in a high-profile trial, which starts in two weeks in Los Angeles.

At first calm about the assignment, spending the first several days sightseeing to check if his handlers, George (Herschel Bernardi) and Marc (Phillip Pine), are being followed, Claude becomes agitated when he discovers the witness in question is a woman, Billie Williams (Caprice Toriel); in his opinion, women are harder to kill than men, because they are "unpredictable". Claude scrambles to find a way to kill Billie, who never leaves her closely guarded house. After two attempts, Claude believes he has killed her, but later discovers that he mistakenly killed a policewoman instead, and the police have covered it up to avoid further attempts on Billie's life.

Out of ideas and convinced the contract is "jinxed", Claude quits, only to find George and Marc have now been instructed to kill him. After killing the men, Claude finally succeeds in sneaking into Billie's house via a culvert, but hesitates when he is about to strangle her. The police arrive; Claude attempts to escape via the culvert but is killed in a shoot-out.

Claude
Claude is set apart from the other hit men in the story by his unwillingness to carry a gun, and his clinical, precise approach to murder, which he treats as a business.

Cast

Vince Edwards as Claude
Phillip Pine as Marc
Herschel Bernardi as George

Caprice Toriel as Billie Williams
Michael Granger as Mr. Moon
Cathy Browne as Mary
Joseph Mell as Harry
Frances Osborne as Miss Wiley

Steven Ritch as plainclothesman
Janet Brandt as woman in movie theater
Davis Roberts as clerk
Don Garrett as James William Mayflower
Gloria Victor as Miss Wexley
Cisco Houston as rifle salesman (uncredited)

Production and distribution
Murder by Contract was directed by Irving Lerner from an original screenplay by Ben Simcoe. At some point, Ben Maddow, who had been nominated for an Academy Award for his screenplay for The Asphalt Jungle, did uncredited work on the script (Maddow also worked uncredited on several other notable films of the era, including Johnny Guitar and The Wild One). The film was shot in seven days in February 1958 in Los Angeles. Produced by Orbit Productions, it was distributed theatrically in December 1958 by Columbia Pictures. Columbia still holds the copyright on the film, dated October 1, 1958.

Influence and reputation
Part of the film's reputation lies in its influence on director Martin Scorsese, who cites it as the one that has influenced his approach to filmmaking the most. Scorsese praises its "economy of style" and compares its ability to communicate ideas through cinematic "shorthand" to the work of Jean-Luc Godard and Robert Bresson. In the September–October 1978 issue of Film Comment, Scorsese included the film in his list of Guilty Pleasures. In addition to the aforementioned ideas, he specifically pointed out the scene showing Claude getting in shape and how it influenced a similar sequence with Robert De Niro in Taxi Driver.

Reviewing it for the Chicago Reader, Jonathan Rosenbaum praises the film as "singular and nearly perfect", noting its "lean, purposeful style" and "witty feeling for character, dialogue, and narrative ellipsis." In overview of a 2006 Film Forum series on film noir for Slant Magazine, Fernando F. Croce writes that "[Irving] Lerner's camera records [Vince] Edwards's moral emptiness with a sharpshooter's calm." The Time Out Film Guide describes Murder by Contract as a "terrific, no-nonsense B movie", praising it as "well ahead of its time" and adding that "Lerner and his superb cameraman, Lucien Ballard, make the most of a shoestring budget to produce a taut, spare, amoral film; it doesn't look restricted, it looks restrained."

Variety'''s original 1958 review singles out Perry Botkin's music for the film for praise, noting that the all-guitar score gives "fine atmospheric backing." Writing in the Radio Times, film-maker Anthony Sloman called Murder by Contract'' "a real gem and total justification for the existence of the B-movie", praising the "darkly sinister plot [which] masks a deeply original screenplay proffering philosophical insights into what makes hitman Vince Edwards tick." He summarised the film as "stunningly well directed by Irving Lerner and cleverly produced on a shoestring, this might be called pretentious by some; another view is that it's original, clever and absorbing. Also tough as nails." On Rotten Tomatoes, the film has an aggregate score of 100% based on 12 critic reviews.

References

External links

Murder by Contract at Rotten Tomatoes
Murder by Contract at Toronto Film Society

1958 films
1958 crime drama films
American crime drama films
American black-and-white films
Film noir
Columbia Pictures films
Films directed by Irving Lerner
Films about contract killing
1950s English-language films
1950s American films